Teluk Tempoyak is a coastal village within Southwest Penang Island District in the Malaysian state of Penang. It is located within the Southwest Penang Island District, near the southeastern tip of Penang Island. The village lies just south of Batu Maung and faces the Penang Strait to the east.

Transportation 
Jalan Teluk Tempoyak is the sole road that runs through the fishing village, branching out from Jalan Permatang Damar Laut and snaking through the village towards the sparsely populated southeastern tip of Penang Island. Teluk Tempoyak is also the southern terminus of Rapid Penang's bus route 305, which links the village with Batu Maung, SPICE Arena, Bayan Baru, Bukit Jambul and Sungai Nibong.

See also 
 Batu Maung
 Permatang Damar Laut

References 

Southwest Penang Island District
Villages in Penang